New Moon is the sixth extended play released by South Korean girl group, AOA, released on November 26, 2019 by FNC Entertainment. It is the group's first and only album as five members following the departure of Mina the following year, as well as the last album released with members Jimin, Yuna, and Seolhyun.

Background information
On October 23, 2019, it was announced that AOA would be making a comeback in the fall after member Seolhyun posted photos from the group's MV shoot to Instagram on the same day.  The album's announcement came during the group's participation on Queedom, where it was announced the group would be performing a new song called "Sorry", on the show's final broadcast on October 21.

Ahead of the album's release, AOA participated in a photoshoot and interview with Harper's Bazaar, where they mentioned how the album would be showing off new sides of the members not seen before.

On November 25th, it was announced that the group's comeback showcase set for the following day had been cancelled as a result of Goo Hara's passing the day prior.

Track listing

Charts

References

2019 EPs
AOA (group) EPs
Korean-language EPs
FNC Entertainment EPs